The William Sloane House (also known as the William and Frances Crocker Sloane House) is a mansion located on 686 Park Avenue between 68th and 69th Streets in the Upper East Side of New York City.

It was constructed for the industrialist William Sloane and his wife Frances Crocker Sloane in 1919 by Delano & Aldrich in the Colonial Revival style as one of the Park Avenue Houses.

It changed ownership multiple times. Today the Italian Cultural Institute of New York is located there, next to the adjacent Italian consulate-general.

The House was designated a landmark by the New York City Landmarks Preservation Commission in 1970. It is on the National Register #80002708 (1980).

References

External links 

Upper East Side
Houses in Manhattan
Park Avenue
New York City Designated Landmarks in Manhattan
Historic district contributing properties in Manhattan